The  Los Angeles Soccer League was a regional soccer league consisting of clubs based in and around Los Angeles. Established as the California Football Association, the league was founded in 1902 and it is one of the oldest soccer leagues in the United States (alongside the Cosmopolitan Soccer League and the Chicago League).

The California Football Association changed, the south split off the San Francisco Soccer Football League and the Greater Los Angeles Soccer League was formed in 1951.

In 1963, Spanish club Real Madrid came to LA to face Los Angeles United at the LA Coliseum. Stars like Paco Gento and Ferenc Puskas gave a great show thrashing the United by 9-0. Months after the game the historical LA United folded. Maccabee Los Angeles would be the team to dominate the league in the 1970s.

Nowadays, semi-professional and amateur leagues in and around Los Angeles are affiliated with the United States Adult Soccer Association region IV (California Soccer Association-South).

Champions

1951-52 teams 
Jackson High School
San Pedro Yugoslavs
Magyar A.C.
LAAC Aztecs
Swiss Soccer clubs
Sons of Colombus
Los Angeles Victoria AC
Danes AC
Scots AC
Necaxa San Bernardino
Austria F.C.
Atlas AC
Maccabee Los Angeles
St.Stephens AC
Olympia
San Pedro Italians

1986-87 teams
Hollywood Stars
San Pedro Yugoslavs
San Pedro Croat
Inter-America
San Gabriel
Carson
Cajititlan
Atletico Latino
Los Angeles United

Notable presidents
Duncan Duff 1953-
Tony Morejon 1981-1989
Gabriel Cucuk 1989-1993

References

 
Soccer leagues in the United States
United States Adult Soccer Association leagues
1902 establishments in California
Sports leagues established in 1902
Regional Soccer leagues in the United States